Birthright Unplugged is an educational organization, designed as a response to the Birthright Israel trips. The name "Birthright Unplugged" is a spin on the "Birthright Israel" program.

History and organization
According to Birthright Unplugged, it was founded in 2003 by Dunya Alwan and Hannah Mermelstein. Alwan serves as the organization's current director.

In 2005, Birthright Israel filed a "cease and desist" complaint against Birthright Unplugged for trademark infringement, alleging "unfair competition".

Activities
The Unplugged trip sought to expose mostly North American people to the Palestinian side of the Israeli–Palestinian conflict through travel and conversations with a range of Palestinian activists. In six days, they visited Palestinian cities, villages, and refugee camps in the West Bank and spend time with Palestinian refugees living inside Israel.

The organization ran a second program, Birthright Re-Plugged, which took Palestinian children living in Palestine refugee camps on field trips in Israel to see the villages left by their families in the 1948 Palestinian exodus. In two days, they visit Jerusalem, the Mediterranean Sea, and the children's ancestral villages.

References

External links
 

Tourism in Israel
Tourism in the State of Palestine